Bad Man's Bluff is a 1926 American silent Western film directed by Alan James and starring Jay Wilsey, Molly Malone and Frank Whitson. It was the last film to be distributed under the Associated Exhibitors banner following its merger with Pathe Exchange. Future star Gary Cooper appeared as an extra.

Cast
 Jay Wilsey as Zane Castleton 
 Molly Malone as Alice Hardy 
 Frank Whitson as Dave Hardy 
 Robert McKenzie as Hank Dooley 
 Wilbur McGaugh as Joe Slade 
 Gary Cooper as Extra

References

External links
 

1926 films
1926 Western (genre) films
Films directed by Alan James
American black-and-white films
Associated Exhibitors films
Silent American Western (genre) films
1920s English-language films
1920s American films